China Railway may refer to companies related to defunct Ministry of Railways:
China Railway, the national railway operator 
China Railway Engineering Corporation, former construction company, now holding company
China Railway Group Limited, construction company
China Railway No.2 Group
China Railway Seventh Group
China Railway Construction Corporation, former construction company, now holding company
China Railway Construction Corporation Limited, construction company 
China Railway Materials
Rail transportation in China